The Zambia Davis Cup team represents Zambia in Davis Cup tennis competition and are governed by the Zambia Lawn Tennis Association. They have not competed since 2013. Some of the members are Webster Munyenyembe, Henry Banda, Sidney Bwalya and, Lawrence Chileshe

History
Zambia competed in its first Davis Cup in 1990.  Their best result was reaching the African Group II quarterfinals in 1991.

Last team (2013) 

 Edgar Kazembe
 Nkumbu Chonya
 Kombe Mabo
 Henry Banda

See also
Davis Cup

External links

Davis Cup teams
Davis Cup
Davis Cup